Haplochromis beadlei is a species of cichlid endemic to Lake Nabugabo in Uganda.  This species reaches a length of  SL. Its specific name honours the chemist and zoologist on the 1930-1931 Cambridge Expedition to the East African Lakes, during which the type of this species was collected, Leonard C. Beadle.

References

Paralabidochromis
Fish described in 1933
Endemic freshwater fish of Uganda
Lake fish of Africa
Taxonomy articles created by Polbot